Härslöv is a locality situated in Landskrona Municipality, Skåne County, Sweden with 382 inhabitants in 2010. The medieval Härslöv Church contains fragmentary Romanesque wall paintings and a richly decorated pulpit from the 17th century.

Härslöv is also the name of a district in Landskrona municipality which encompasses some parts of the Landskrona urban area.

References 

Populated places in Landskrona Municipality
Populated places in Skåne County
Districts of Landskrona